Oreobates saxatilis, also known as Tarapoto big-headed frog, is a species of frog in the family Strabomantidae. It is endemic to Peru and known from near its type locality near Tarapoto (San Martín Province) as well as from the Río Tambo District in the Satipo Province, Panguana in the Puerto Inca Province, and Río Kimbiri in the La Convención Province.

Description
Oreobates saxatilis are large-sized among the Oreobates species; adults measure  in snout–vent length. The head is large and wider than long; the snout is short. The tympanum is distinct; the supra-tympanic fold is weak and short. The fingers and toes are long and slender and have no lateral fringes nor keels. Skin is granular, with round keratinized granules and small (only some slightly enlarged), sparse, low, flat warts. The venter is smooth. The dorsum is greyish brown with darker brown markings. The belly is immaculate.

Habitat and conservation
In 2018 it was assessed as "Least Concern" by the International Union for Conservation of Nature (IUCN).

References

saxatilis
Amphibians of Peru
Amphibians of the Andes
Endemic fauna of Peru
Taxa named by William Edward Duellman
Amphibians described in 1990
Taxonomy articles created by Polbot